Soul food is a type of cuisine.

Soul Food may also refer to:

Motion pictures
 Soul Food (film), a 1997 American comedy-drama film
 Soul Food (soundtrack), the soundtrack to the 1997 film Soul Food
 Soul Food (TV series), an American television drama

Music
 Soul Food (Def Jef album)
 Soul Food (Goodie Mob album)
 Soulfood (Shirley Murdock album), 2007
 Soul Food (Oblivians album)
 Soul Food (Bobby Timmons album), 1966
 "Soul Food", a single by rapper Big K.R.I.T. from his album Cadillactica
 "Soul Food", a song by singer Keith Urban from his album The Speed of Now Part 1
 "Soul Food", a song by Sonny Stitt featuring Don Patterson from the album Shangri-La

See also
Chicken Soup for the Soul